= Tahil (Sharjah) =

- Location within United Arab Emirates
- Coordinates: 25°22′42″N 55°47′19.7″E
- Country: United Arab Emirates
- Emirate: Sharjah

Tahil is a remote desert village in Sharjah, United Arab Emirates.

The small community of Tahil is connected to Sharjah by a road, constructed in 2014, linking Tahil with the Al Rafiya and Al Zubair roads. Consisting of a small collection of houses and a mosque, Tahil's road network is lit by 140 solar lights, installed by Sharjah Electricity and Water Authority (SEWA) in 2017.

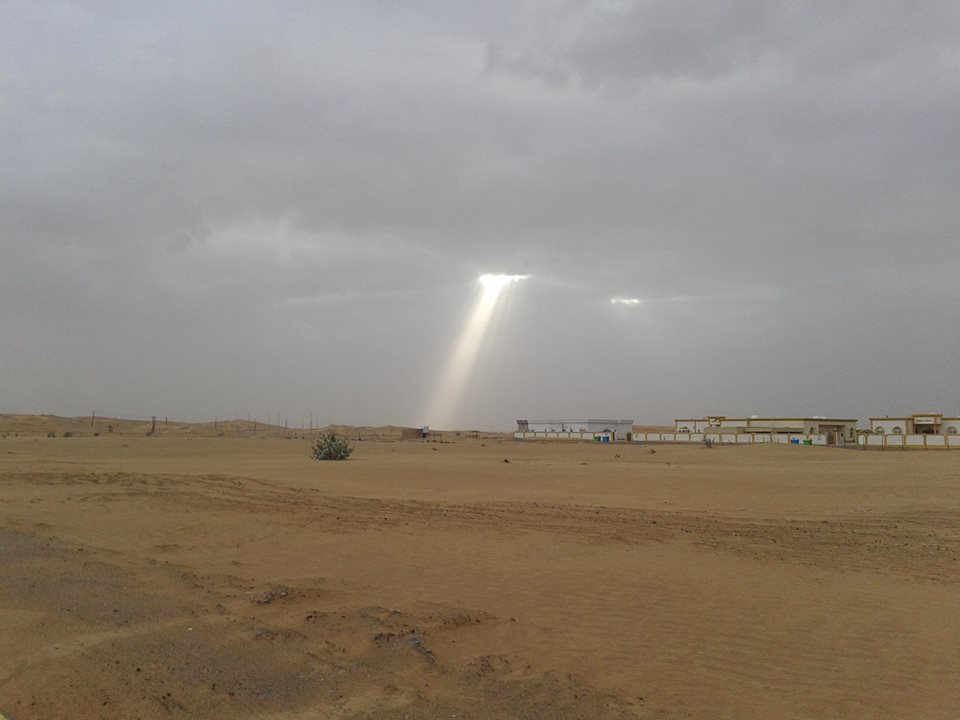
The desert village of Tahil in winter
